Lars Øyno (born 1 August 1955) is a Norwegian actor, director and playwright who lives and works in Oslo.

He was educated at the National Academy of Theater 1981-1984. He worked as an actor at the Trøndelag Teater 1984-1992.

Øyno has portrayed his countryman Knut Hamsun in the eponymous Norwegian mini-series. He also participated in movies such as Bat Wings and O' Horten. 

From 1992 Øyno has managed the underground theatre Grusomhetens Teater (= Theatre of Cruelty), now situated at Hausmania in Oslo. His theatrical ideology is inspired by the visions of Antonin Artaud.

Performances he has created and directed at Grusomhetens Teater include:
 Revolutionary Messages (2013)
 Amazonas (2011)
 What a Glorious Day! An hommage to Bendik Riis (2011)
 Last Song (2009)
 Mountain Bird (2009)
 Theatre and Science (2007)
 The Ugly Duckling (2006)
 The Spurt of Blood (2005)
 The Gospel according to Thomas (2004)
 The Dollhouse (2003)
 Peer Gynt (2002)
 Alaska (2001)
 Poetries (2000)
 Black Sun (1999)
 The Philosopher's Stone (1997)
 Woyzeck (1996)
 Storyteller (1995)
 The Road to Heaven (1995)
 The World of Jotner (1994)
 To Have Dealt With the Judgement of God (1993)
 Peace (1992)
 Elagabal (Trøndelag Teater, 1989)

External links

 Grusomhetens Teater / The Theatre of Cruelty in Oslo

Living people
1955 births
Date of birth missing (living people)
Place of birth missing (living people)
Norwegian theatre directors
Norwegian theatre managers and producers
Norwegian male stage actors
Norwegian male television actors
Norwegian male film actors